Seven Waves Away (alternate U.S. titles: Abandon Ship! and Seven Days From Now) is a 1957 British adventure film directed by Richard Sale and starring Tyrone Power, Mai Zetterling, Lloyd Nolan, and Stephen Boyd. When his ship goes down, an officer has to make an agonizing decision on his overcrowded lifeboat.

Richard Sale adapted the film from his 1938 short story of the same name, originally published by Scribner's Magazine. The plot has similarities to the real-life sinking of the American ship William Brown in 1841. The William Brown hit an iceberg 250 miles off Newfoundland and lost 31 of its 65 passengers. Two boats with 17 crewmen and the remaining passengers escaped the wreck, but more than a dozen passengers were sacrificed from the crowded longboat.

Though there is no direct acknowledgment by the filmmakers, the film ends with a voice-over stating, "The story which you have just seen is a true one. In real life, Captain [sic] Alexander Holmes was brought to trial on a charge of murder. He was convicted and given the minimum sentence of six months because of the unusual circumstances surrounding the incident."

Plot
The luxury liner SS Crescent Star sinks in seven minutes after striking a derelict mine in the middle of the Atlantic Ocean, taking with her nearly all of the 1,156 people on board. Twenty-seven of the survivors converge on a single lifeboat designed to accommodate only nine. The dying captain passes command to executive officer Alec Holmes. Holmes then learns from "Sparks" Clary, the ship's radio operator, that both transmitters were destroyed before a call for help could be sent. When Holmes organizes shifts between the men in the water hanging on the side and those in the boat, Edith Middleton insists on taking a turn in the sea. Mr. Hayden swamps the boat when he fails to listen to instructions, but everyone is brought back aboard. Holmes and Mr. McKinley talk about the impossibility of rowing a boat this heavy any distance at all, much less to the nearest land, Africa, 1,500 miles away.

The mortally injured ship's engineer, Frank Kelly, warns Holmes that he must "evict some of the tenants" if anyone is to survive – "anyone who can't pay the rent, like me". Holmes is horrified and rejects the idea. "I thought you had guts enough to save half of them, instead of losing them all,"  Kelly replies. Later in the night, Cookie thinks he sees light on the water. They fire a flare, but there is no response. The passengers talk revealingly about themselves and why they were on the cruise. Mr. Wilson, in the water, is found to be dead.

With a major storm approaching, Kelly tells Julie "be kind to him when it happens." Kelly struggles to his feet, points to the dying and the sick aboard and calls on Holmes to save those he can, then sacrifices himself by jumping overboard. Holmes tries to save him, but he goes under.

As the gale worsens, Holmes eventually decides to take responsibility for choosing. And it will not be "women and children first". Some people are already dying of their injuries. When he orders officer Will McKinley to slip the first of these, an unconscious woman, over the side, McKinley protests and then goes overboard to receive her in his arms.

One male passenger is knocked overboard by accident but Holmes sends others to certain death, until there are 15 left aboard. Only those capable of rowing to Africa, and a young boy who represents the future, will survive.  Middleton observes that an atomic scientist, a brilliant playwright, and a famous former opera singer have been sacrificed to save two "apemen", a racketeer, and a devout coward, and asks, including herself, "Why are the wicked so strong?"

Passenger Michael Faroni demands that Holmes go back for the others. Holmes refuses (it is impossible anyway) and Faroni wounds him in the shoulder by throwing a switchblade and is in turn shot dead with a flare gun.

As Holmes predicted, the sea becomes a "nightmare" through which they row, relentlessly. The lightened lifeboat weathers the storm and the rest of the survivors thank Holmes for saving them. Realising he is now a liability due to his infected wound, Holmes refuses water and passes command to Clary. Holmes throws himself overboard, but they bring him back. Then, they hear a foghorn and see a ship emerging from the fog. As it comes to pick them up, Edith Middleton murmurs, "Too soon, Just a little bit too soon, brave captain." The survivors, with the exception of Julie and Middleton, quickly repudiate Holmes' actions. Alongside the ship, Clary returns the ring. As Holmes climbs aboard on the rope ladder, alone, a voiceover says: "The story which you have just seen is a true one. In real life, Captain  Alexander Holmes was brought to trial on a charge of murder. He was convicted and given the minimum sentence of six months because of the unusual circumstances surrounding the incident. If you had been a member of the jury, how would you have voted, guilty or innocent?" The question, "Guilty or innocent?", in large  bold letters, lingers on the screen, while the camera remains trained on the lifeboat, floating empty and adrift.

Cast

Reception
According to Kinematograph Weekly the film was "in the money" at the British box office in 1957.

See also
 Souls at Sea, a 1937 Henry Hathaway film also based on the William Brown incident
 Lifeboat, 1944 Alfred Hitchcock film
 Survival film, about the film genre, with a list of related films
 RMS Lady Hawkins a passenger vessel whose story is similar with an overcrowded lifeboat

References

External links
 
 
 
 

1957 films
1957 drama films
1957 adventure films
1950s English-language films
1950s British films
1950s survival films
British survival films
British drama films
British adventure films
British black-and-white films
Films directed by Richard Sale
Columbia Pictures films
Seafaring films based on actual events
Films about survivors of seafaring accidents or incidents